

This is intended to be a complete list of the properties and districts on the National Register of Historic Places in Fairfield County, Connecticut, United States. The locations of National Register properties and districts for which the latitude and longitude coordinates are included below may be seen in an online map.

There are 293 properties and districts listed on the National Register in the county, including 9 National Historic Landmarks. Of these, 55 are located in the city of Bridgeport and covered separately in National Register of Historic Places listings in Bridgeport, Connecticut. Thirty-four are covered in National Register of Historic Places listings in Greenwich, Connecticut and another 34 are covered in National Register of Historic Places listings in Stamford, Connecticut. There are 171 properties and districts which are entirely outside those three cities or which span outside, and which are covered here in this list (Merritt Parkway is listed here as well as in the Greenwich and Stamford lists).

All of the National Historic Landmarks are listed here or in the Greenwich and Stamford subareas. Forty-six of these here or in Greenwich or Stamford are historic districts.

Architecture addressed in the NRHP listings is quite varied. Of special interest is an unusual concentration of modern or International Style houses in New Canaan, Connecticut, designed by the "Harvard Five" architects, including: Landis Gores House, the Richard and Geraldine Hodgson House, the Philip Johnson Glass House, and the Noyes House.

There are numerous bridges included in the listings. Seven are moveable bridges, including the Saugatuck River Bridge from 1884, the oldest moveable bridge in the state, and the Washington Bridge which carries U.S. 1 into New Haven County. Five are moveable railway bridges: the Mianus River Railroad Bridge, the Norwalk River Railroad Bridge, the Saugatuck River Railroad Bridge, the Pequonnock River Railroad Bridge (in Bridgeport), and the Housatonic River Railroad Bridge. One bridge is part of a dam and hydroelectric plant complex, the Stevenson Dam Hydroelectric Plant. Five bridges bring roads across shorter crossings: the Perry Avenue Bridge in Norwalk; the Main Street Bridge and the Turn-of-River Bridge in Stamford; the Riverside Avenue Bridge in Greenwich; and the picturesque Pine Creek Park Bridge in Fairfield. Also there are numerous bridges that are included in the Merritt Parkway listing, out of 69 original bridges of the parkway. (This includes both bridges carrying the Merritt Parkway, and bridges crossing it). Other bridges are contributing structures within historic districts, such as the Pulaski Street Bridge within the South End Historic District of Stamford, and a concrete arch bridge from 1941 in the Aspetuck Historic District.

There are nine NRHP-listed lighthouses (including two in Bridgeport).

Seven sites are listed partially or wholly for their association with the marches of French General Rochambeau's troops through the county on their way to and from victory at Yorktown, Virginia, in 1781. The sites still evoke the character of the well-mapped route of the army in 1781 and 1782.

Current listings

|}

Former listings

|}

See also

List of National Historic Landmarks in Connecticut
National Register of Historic Places listings in Connecticut

References

 
 
Fairfield